Henrique N'zita Tiago (14 July 1927 – 3 June 2016) was President of the Armed Forces of Cabinda, a rebel group that fights for the independence of Cabinda from Angola. He died in Paris on 3 June 2016. It was reported that Tiago was 88 years old when he died, and that he was buried in France – as Cabinda was not independent at the time of his death.

Biography 

He was born on July 14, 1927, at the mission of San Jose de Luali in the region of Dinge, or in Mboma Lubinda, Cabinda, into a modest family.

In 1963, he co-founded the Front for the Liberation of the Enclave of Cabinda (FLEC) to fight against Portuguese colonial rule. Because he was part of the FLEC, he was arrested in 1970 by the colonial PIDE. He served his sentence in the São Nicolau jail in Bentiaba. He was released in 1974, opened a FLEC office in Tchiowa, the capital of Cabinda; and a year later, he was appointed chairman of the FLEC. Upon learning that the Portuguese government was planning to include Cabinda as part of Angola, N'zita started an armed conflict against Angola's pro-independence armed groups. His firm position to achieve the independence of Cabinda only by military means caused the FLEC to fragment into different factions.

He went into exile to France. N'zita died in Paris on June 3, 2016. His funeral was on June 10. Upon his death, his son, Emmanuel N'zita, succeeded him as Commander of the Armed Forces of Cabinda a few days later.

See also 
 Front for the Liberation of the Enclave of Cabinda
 Angolan Civil War

References 

1927 births
2016 deaths
People from Cabinda Province
Cabindan independence activists
Angolan rebels
Angolan revolutionaries
Angolan warlords
20th-century Angolan people
21st-century Angolan people